Spruce Avenue is an irregular shaped residential neighbourhood in Edmonton, Alberta, Canada.  The neighbourhood is home to Kingsway Mall, the Glenrose Rehabilitation Hospital, the Northern Alberta Institute of Technology, the Norwood Extended Care Hospital, Spruce Avenue Community Center, Spruce Avenue Junior High School, and St. Basil Catholic Junior High School. The neighbourhood takes its name from the former designation of 114 Avenue.

It is bounded on the south by 111 Avenue, on the east by 97 Street and on the south west by Kingsway Avenue.  The northeast boundary runs along Princess Elizabeth Avenue to 107 Street before turning north along 107 Street.  The north boundary then follows 118 Avenue (Alberta Avenue) until it reaches 97 Street.

Surrounding neighbourhoods are Westwood to the north, Alberta Avenue to the east and north east, McCauley to the south east, Central McDougall to the south, Queen Mary Park to the southwest, and Prince Rupert to the west.  To the north west is the Edmonton City Centre Airport.

The community is represented by the Spruce Avenue Community League, established in 1918, which maintains a community hall located at 102 Street and 115 Avenue.

Demographics 

Residential development 
Spruce Avenue is an older neighbourhood with just under one residence in three constructed by the end of World War II.  Substantially all construction was completed by 1980. While the most common type of residence is the single-family dwelling (63%), there are a significant number of apartments (24%) and row houses (11%).  Approximately six out of every ten residences are rented, with the remainder being owner occupied.

Surrounding neighborhoods

See also 
 Edmonton Federation of Community Leagues

References

External links 
Spruce Avenue Neighbourhood Profile

Neighbourhoods in Edmonton

Official website